The Hunter 37 Legend is an American sailboat that was designed by Hunter Marine founder Warren Luhrs and first built in 1986.

The Hunter 37 Legend is sometimes confused with the unrelated 1978 Hunter 37 design.

Production
The design was built by Hunter Marine in the United States between 1986 and 1988, but it is now out of production.

Design
The Hunter 37 Legend is a recreational keelboat, built predominantly of fiberglass, with wood trim. It has a fractional sloop rig, a raked stem, a reverse transom, an internally-mounted spade-type rudder controlled by a wheel and a fixed fin keel or optional wing keel. It displaces  and carries  of ballast.

The wing keel version of the design has a PHRF racing average handicap of 108 with a high of 121 and low of 99.

See also
List of sailing boat types

Similar sailboats
Hunter 37
Hunter 37.5 Legend
Hunter 376

References

Keelboats
1980s sailboat type designs
Sailing yachts
Sailboat type designs by Warren Luhrs
Sailboat types built by Hunter Marine